Team 3C Gruppe was a German UCI Continental team that existed from 2002 until 2008.

For the 2003 season the team wanted to show itself in the second division managed to hire many riders from the top tier.
In 2007 Dominic Klemme won the German national Under-23 Road race in a seven-man sprint to the line.

Final roster

Major wins
Sources:

2002
No recorded wins
2003
 Stage 4 Giro del Capo, Jonas Owczarek
2004
 Stage 1 Flèche du Sud, Jonas Owczarek
 Stage 2 Giro del Capo, David Kopp
 Rund um Düren, David Kopp
 Stage 6 Bayern Rundfahrt, Stefan Schumacher
 Noord-Nederland Tour, Stefan Kupfernagel
 Sparkassen Giro Bochum, David Kopp
 Egmont Cycling Race, David Kopp
 Druivenkoers Overijse, Stefan Schumacher
 Rund um den Sachsenring, Björn Papstein
 Stage 5 Rheinland-Pfalz Rundfahrt, Björn Glasner
2005
 Ronde van Drenthe, Marcel Sieberg
 Stage 3 Niedersachsen Rundfahrt, Björn Papstein
 Stage 5 Rheinland-Pfalz Rundfahrt, Christoph van Kleinsorgen
 Stage 4 Tour of Qinghai Lake, Stefan Cohnen
2006
 Stages 2 & 3 Course de la Paix, Danilo Hondo
 Stage 3b Thüringen Rundfahrt der U23, Sören Hofmann
 Neuseen Classics, Danilo Hondo
 Circuito Montañés
Stage 1, Hannes Blank
Stages 2 & 3, Danilo Hondo
 Stage 2 Sachsen Tour, Danilo Hondo
 Stage 1 Regio-Tour, Danilo Hondo
 Stage 1 Tour de Indonesia, André Schulze
 Omloop van de Vlaamse Scheldeboorden, Danilo Hondo
2007
  National Road Race Championships, Erik Hoffmann
 Stage 1 Circuito Montañes, Erik Hoffmann
 Rund um den Sachsenring, Tobias Erler
  National Under-23 Road Race Championships, Dominic Klemme
2008
 Vuelta a Cuba
Stage 4, Matthias Friedemann
Stage 10, René Obst
 Grand Prix de la Ville de Lillers, Dominic Klemme
 Stage 3 Thüringen Rundfahrt der U23, Dominic Klemme
 Stage 2 Regio-Tour, Dominic Klemme
 Druivenkoers Overijse, Dominic Klemme

National champions
2007
  Namibia Road race, Erik Hoffmann
  German Road race, Dominic Klemme

References

Defunct cycling teams based in Germany
Cycling teams based in Germany
Cycling teams established in 2002
Cycling teams disestablished in 2008
UCI Continental Teams (Europe)